The Welsh Rugby Union Division Six East (also called the SWALEC Division Six East for sponsorship reasons) is a rugby union league in Wales.

Competition
There are 10 clubs in the WRU Division Six East. During the course of a season (which lasts from September to May) each club plays the others twice, once at their home ground and once at the home ground of their opponents for a total of 18 games for each club, with a total of 90 games in each season. Teams receive four points for a win and two point for a draw, an additional bonus point is awarded to either team if they score four tries or more in a single match. No points are awarded for a loss though the losing team can gain a bonus point for finishing the match within seven points of the winning team. Teams are ranked by total points, then the number of tries scored and then points difference. At the end of each season, the club with the most points is crowned as champion. If points are equal the tries scored then points difference determines the winner.

Sponsorship 
In 2008 the Welsh Rugby Union announced a new sponsorship deal for the club rugby leagues with SWALEC valued at £1 million (GBP). The initial three year sponsorship was extended at the end of the 2010/11 season, making SWALEC the league sponsors until 2015. The leagues sponsored are the WRU Divisions one through to seven.

 (2007–2008) No sponsor as league created during sponsorship term.
 (2008–2015) SWALEC

2010/2011 Season

League teams
 Aberbeeg RFC
 Aberbargoed RFC
 Abertysswg RFC
 Beaufort RFC
 Blaina United RFC
 Cefn Fforest RFC
 Cwm RFC
 Forgeside RFC
 Markham RFC
 Trefil RFC

2009/2010 Season

League teams
 Aberbeeg RFC
 Aberbargoed RFC
 Abertysswg RFC
 Beaufort RFC
 Blaina United RFC
 Cefn Fforest RFC
 Cwm RFC
 Forgeside RFC
 Markham RFC
 Trefil RFC

League table

2008/2009 Season

League teams
 Abertysswg RFC
 Beaufort RFC
 Blackwood Stars RFC
 Caerleon RFC
 Crickhowell RFC
 Hartridge RFC
 Markham RFC
 New Panteg RFC
 St. Julians HSOB RFC
 Whiteheads RFC

2007/2008 Season
 Beaufort RFC
 Blackwood Stars RFC
 Caerleon RFC
 Crickhowell RFC
 Hartridge RFC
 Markham RFC
 New Panteg RFC
 St. Julians HSOB RFC
 Trefil RFC
 Whiteheads RFC

References

8